The Political Film Society Award for democracy is given out each year to a film that promotes, educates, and raises the awareness level of the public in the specific areas of democracy and freedom.  This award has been handed out by the Society since 1988.  Depending on the number of movies that qualify, sometimes only one film is nominated for this award, but as many as seven have been nominated in years past.

The film that first won this award was The Milagro Beanfield War in 1988 that was directed by Robert Redford.  The only other award nominated in 1988 against The Milagro Beanfield War was Stand and Deliver.  The award, as with any other Political Film Society Award, can go to a mainstream film, independent film, or even an international film.  The Political Film Society looks at a broad selection of movies before it nominates them for an award.

1980s
1988 The Milagro Beanfield War
 Stand and Deliver
1989 Dead Poets Society

1990s
1990 Born on the Fourth of July
1991 City of Hope
 JFK
1992 Bob Roberts
 City of Joy
 Howards End 
 The Power of One
1993 Indochine
 Dave
 The Secret Garden
 The Piano
1994 Rapa Nui
1995 Beyond Rangoon
1996 No films won
Basquiat
Dead Man Walking
The People Vs. Larry Flynt
1997 Red Corner
Rainmaker
1998 Four Days in September 
Enemy of the State
Primary Colors
The Siege
The Truman Show
Wag the Dog
1999 The Insider
East of Hope Street
Fight Club
Naturally Native
Three Kings

2000s
2000 Sunshine
The Contender
Human Resources 
The Hurricane 
It All Starts Today 
Steal This Movie!
2001 The Majestic
Antitrust
Bread and Roses
Lumumba
2002 Y Tu Mamá También
24 Hour Party People
Das Experiment
Max
Secret Ballot
The Town Is Quiet
Atlantis: The Lost Empire 
Bread and Roses
Lumumba
2003 Shattered Glass
Herod's Law
Runaway Jury
Sandstorm
Veronica Guerin
2004 Silver City
The Assassination of Richard Nixon
Moolaadé
The Motorcycle Diaries
2005 Machuca
Downfall
2006 Sophie Scholl: The Final Days
Cautiva
Death of a President
The Listening
2007 Amazing Grace
September Dawn
Shooter
2008 Milk
Changeling
Flash of Genius
Nothing But the Truth
2009 Invictus

2010s
2010 Blood Done Sign My Name
Formosa Betrayed
Princess Ka`iulani
2011 The Lady
Amigo
Elite Squad 2: The Enemy Within
Of Gods and Men
Man of the Year
2012 Lincoln
Promised Land
2013 Mandela: Long Walk to Freedom
Capital
2014 Cesar Chavez
Free the Nipple
Kill the Messenger
2015 Jimmy's Hall
Straight Outta Compton
The 33
Timbuktu
2017 A United Kingdom
Bitter Harvest
The Post
Tickling Giants
2019 The Report
Official Secrets

2020s
2020
Irresistible
2021
Hive
2022 [Argentina, 1985]]

See also
Political Film Society Award for Exposé
Political Film Society Award for Human Rights
Political Film Society Award for Peace

References

Political Film Society
Awards established in 1988